Molliens-Dreuil is a commune in the Somme department in Hauts-de-France in northern France.

Geography

History
By a decree of 19 September 1972, the two communes of Dreuil-lès-Molliens and Molliens-Vidame were combined into one, Molliens-Dreuil. 
Molliens was first a commune in 1209 and was under the jurisdiction of the seigneurs of Picquigny from the twelfth century right up until the French Revolution, as was the neighbouring village of Dreuil.

Population

Places of interest
 Evidence of a  feudal motte.
 sixteenth century church of St.Pierre-aux-Liens
 eighteenth century church of Saint Martin. Displayed inside is a 15th-century bas-relief of Christ.

See also
Communes of the Somme department

References

External links

 Parish website (23 communes) by Abbé Jean-Pierre Dalibot 

Communes of Somme (department)